The Zuojiang Huashan Rock Art Cultural Landscape is an extensive assembly of historical rock art that were painted on limestone cliff faces in Guangxi, southern China. The paintings are located on the west bank of the Ming River which is a tributary of the Zuo River. The area of the paintings is part of the Nonggang Nature Reserve and belongs to Ningming County. On July 15, 2016, Zuojiang Huashan Rock Art Cultural Landscape was listed as the 49th UNESCO World Heritage Site in China.
 
The main area contains about 1900 discrete countable images arranged in about 110 groups. The paintings have a red color and were executed using a mixture of red ochre (hematite), animal glue, and blood. They depict human figures as well as animals along with bronze drums, knives, swords, bells, and ships.

The painting's were originally thought to date from the period around the 5th century BCE, to the 2nd century CE. However, recent carbon dating suggests that the oldest paintings were executed around 16,000 years ago. Whereas the youngest are around 690 years old. The period of their creations spans the times from the Warring States period to the late Han Dynasty in the history of China. Many of the paintings are thought to "illustrate the life and rituals" of the ancient Luo Yue people, who inhabited the valley of Zuo River during this period and are believed to be ancestors of Zhuang people, Muong people and Kinh people.

An exhibition in the Zhuang Nationality Museum in the City of Chongzuo is dedicated to the history and interpretation of the paintings.

References

External links 
 The Rock Art of Huashan - Sacred Meeting Place for Sky, Water & Earth
 UNESCO UHC: Zuojiang Huashan Rock Art Cultural Landscape

World Heritage Sites in China
Geography of Guangxi
Rock art in China
Major National Historical and Cultural Sites in Guangxi